Janine Whitlock (born 11 August 1973) is an English pole vaulter.

Athletics career
She represented England in the pole vault event, at the 1998 Commonwealth Games in Kuala Lumpur, Malaysia. Two years later she represented Great Britain at the 2000 Summer Olympics.

Her personal best is 4.47 metres, achieved in July 2005 at the Crystal Palace National Sports Centre, in the same meet that Yelena Isinbayeva became the first woman to clear 5 metres.

In 2002 Whitlock was found guilty of methandienone doping. The sample was delivered on 16 June 2002 during the English Commonwealth Games trials. She received a suspension from July 2002 to July 2004.

Achievements

See also
List of sportspeople sanctioned for doping offences

External links

References

1973 births
Living people
English female pole vaulters
Athletes (track and field) at the 1998 Commonwealth Games
Athletes (track and field) at the 2000 Summer Olympics
Olympic athletes of Great Britain
Doping cases in athletics
English sportspeople in doping cases
Commonwealth Games competitors for England